Talleh may refer to:
 Talleh-ye Bala
 Talleh Zang
 Talleh Zargeh

See also
 Taleh, Iran (disambiguation)